The mayoral election of 2001 in Pittsburgh, Pennsylvania was held on Tuesday, November 6, 2001. The incumbent mayor, Tom Murphy of the Democratic Party was running for a record-tying third straight term.

Primary elections

Tom Murphy had a very close and personal primary battle with City Council President and future mayor Bob O'Connor.  Murphy won the primary by just a few hundred votes, and in later years this primary battle was the subject of a  U.S. Department of Justice probe.  It was alleged but never proven in court that Mayor Murphy had a quid pro quo agreement with the powerful Firefighters union in the city, promising to exempt them from citywide budget cuts in return for "bought" votes.

General election
A total of 52,839 votes were cast in the heavily Democratic city. As expected, Murphy won by a huge margin over James Carmine, a philosophy professor at Carlow University.

References

2001 Pennsylvania elections
2001 United States mayoral elections
2001
2000s in Pittsburgh
November 2001 events in the United States